Darius Albert Delfín Dasig (June 10, 1963 – March 13, 2012), more widely known as Bodjie Dasig, was a Filipino singer, songwriter and music producer.

He first came into prominence for writing the song "Ale (nasa Langit Na ba Ako)?" ("Ma'am [Have I Gone to Heaven]?") and "Maáalala Mo Pa Rin" ("You'll Still Remember") for singer Richard Reynoso, and "Ayo' ko Na Sana" ("I Wish I Didn't Have To") for Ariel Rivera. He also wrote and sang the hit song "Sana Dalawa ang Puso Ko" ("I Wish I Had Two Hearts") for his band Bodjie's Law of Gravity, which became the theme song of a movie with the same name in 1994.

He also collaborated with his wife Odette Dasig (née Quesada), whom he married in 1993.

Dasig died in a Los Angeles hospital on March 12, 2012 after a long bout with cancer. He was survived by Odette and their son Darian.

References

External links
 
 Bodjie Dasig – list of songs written by Bodjie Dasig. From the official website of the Performers Rights Society of the Philippines.

1963 births
2012 deaths
Filipino songwriters
Place of birth missing
Deaths from kidney cancer